Ani is an Armenian feminine given name given in reference to the medieval Armenian capital city of Ani. The name was among the top 10 most popular names given to newborn girls in Armenia in 2012. It is also a nickname.

Notable people with the name include:
 Ani Batikian (born 1982), Armenian violinist living in Scotland
 Ani Choying Drolma (born 1971), Nepalese Buddhist nun and musician
 Angela Ani DiFranco (born 1970), American singer, guitarist, and songwriter
 Ani Ghukasyan (born 1990), Armenian professional footballer
 Ani Idrus (1918–1999), Sumatran reporter and co-founder of Waspada daily newspaper
 Ani Kaaro (died 1901), New Zealand tribal leader and prophet
 Ani Kavafian (born 1948), classical violinist
 Ani Khachikyan (born 1991), track and field sprint athlete who competes internationally for Armenia
 Ani Mijačika (born 1987), professional Croatian tennis player
 Ani Mirotadze (born 1975), Georgian journalist and politician
 Ani Nyhus (born 1983), Canadian softball pitcher
 Ani Pachen (1933–2002), Tibetan Buddhist nun who led her clan in armed rebellion against China
 Ani Palian, 21st century Ukrainian Paralympic swimmer
 Ani Phyo (born 1968), organic eco chef, author, founder of SmartMonkey Foods
 Ani Samsonyan (born 1990), American politician and journalist
 Ani Vardanyan (born 1991), Armenian figure skater
 Ani, Theban scribe for whom the Papyrus of Ani was compiled

See also

Ant (name)

References 

Armenian feminine given names